Khachim Amirkhanovich Mashukov (born 22 February 1995) is a Russian football player. He plays as a left midfielder for FC Forte Taganrog.

Club career
He made his professional debut in the Russian Professional Football League for PFC Spartak Nalchik on 19 October 2014 in a game against FC Anzhi-2 Makhachkala.

He made his Russian Football National League debut for FC Avangard Kursk on 3 March 2019 in a game against FC Baltika Kaliningrad.

Personal life
He is an identical twin brother of Islam Mashukov.

References

External links
 

1995 births
Sportspeople from Nalchik
Living people
Russian footballers
Twin sportspeople
Association football midfielders
PFC Spartak Nalchik players
FC Avangard Kursk players
FC Tekstilshchik Ivanovo players
FC Chayka Peschanokopskoye players
FC SKA Rostov-on-Don players
Russian First League players
Russian Second League players